D110 is the main state road on the islands of Pašman and Ugljan in Croatia, connecting the towns of Preko and Tkon. From these two towns Jadrolinija ferries cross to the mainland, docking in Zadar and joining the D407 state road (from Preko) and Biograd na Moru and the D503 state road (from Tkon). The two islands are connected via the Ždrelac Bridge, spanning Mali Ždrelac strait.

The road, as well as all other state roads in Croatia, is managed and maintained by Hrvatske ceste, a state-owned company.

Traffic volume 

Traffic is regularly counted and reported by Hrvatske ceste (HC), operator of the road. Furthermore, the HC reports the number of vehicles using the Split – Supetar and Makarska – Sumartin ferry lines, connecting the D113 road to the D410 and the D411 state roads. Substantial variations between annual (AADT) and summer (ASDT) traffic volumes are attributed to the fact that the road connects a number of island resorts.

Road junctions and populated areas

Sources

See also
 Hrvatske ceste
 Jadrolinija

State roads in Croatia
Transport in Zadar County
Ugljan
Pašman